The Contortionist is an American progressive metal band from Indianapolis, Indiana. Formed in 2007, the band consists of guitarists Robby Baca and Cameron Maynard, drummer Joey Baca, vocalist Mike Lessard, bassist Jordan Eberhardt, and keyboardist Eric Guenther. They have released four studio albums and three EPs. The band signed with eOne Music and Good Fight Entertainment in early 2010.

History
The Contortionist formed in 2007 under the name At the Hands of Machines with vocalist Jake Morris, guitarists Roby Baca and Cameron Maynard, bassist Christopher Tilley, and drummer Joey Baca. The band's first release, the EP Sporadic Movements, was released later that year. At the Hands of Machines changed their name to The Contortionist following the EP's release and the same line-up recorded the EP Shapeshifter, which was released in September 2008. These two EPs featured a deathcore sound in contrast to the band's later works. Following the release of Shapeshifter, vocalist Jake Morris left the band and was replaced by Dave Hoffman, who also provided keyboards. The band entered Voltaic Recording Studio in early 2009 and released their third EP, Apparition, in September of that year. The sound of this EP continued the deathcore sound heard with Morris, but also showed the band incorporating elements of progressive metal into its music.

Hoffman departed the band in early 2010 and was replaced by Jonathan Carpenter. Not too long after Carpenter's arrival, The Contortionist began work on their debut album, Exoplanet. Exoplanet was released on August 31, 2010 through Good Fight Entertainment. The album's sound continued the progressive metal/deathcore sound heard on Apparition, with lyrics exploring themes such as space and interstellar travel. Several of the album's songs are reworked songs from Apparition, featuring new lyrics written by Carpenter with slightly different musical passages. The band's second album, Intrinsic, was released on July 17, 2012. A month before the album's release, the Contortionist released their first music video for the song "Holomovement." The sound of Intrinsic differed from previous releases; the album still contained elements of deathcore, but had a greater focus on melody and atmosphere. Carpenter's lyrics focused on science fiction themes which are reflected in the music videos for "Causality" and "Dreaming Schematics."

In March 2013, Jonathan Carpenter announced his departure from the band. At the time, Carpenter and his longtime girlfriend (now his wife) were expecting their first child. He left on good terms with the band to focus on his personal life and starting his family. Carpenter commented on his departure:

Robby Baca also commented on Carpenter leaving:
"We are sad to see John go, but at the same time remain fully supportive of his decision. We look forward to the process of finding a new vocalist and writing a new record."

Mike Lessard of Last Chance to Reason  took over vocal duties for upcoming shows until the band found a permanent replacement. Mike Lessard commented on filling in for Carpenter:

"I'm happy to be helping my friends in the Contortionist for the next few months on tour as a temporary vocalist. I'll be returning to my duties in Last Chance to Reason once these dates are finished in May. I look forward to seeing a bunch of new and familiar faces in the months to come."
On June 21, 2013, the Contortionist announced via their Facebook page that Mike Lessard was officially their new vocalist.

On April 23, 2014, the Contortionist announced via Facebook the completion of recording their third full-length album. The album was produced by Jamie King (Between the Buried and Me, He Is Legend, the Human Abstract, among many others). On June 26, 2014, the Contortionist announced on their Facebook page that their new album, entitled Language, would be released September 16, 2014 through eOne and Good Fight Music. It was also officially made known that bassist Christopher Tilley had been replaced by former Scale the Summit bassist, Jordan Eberhardt, for unannounced reasons. During an AMA session, which took place on September 12, a question regarding Christopher Tilley's departure was answered, the band's response was: "Touring and all that comes with it just wasn't what Tilley wanted to do anymore. We love Chris and wish him the best!"

The band released their fourth album, entitled Clairvoyant, on September 15, 2017. This album featured a softer sound, with predominantly clean vocals.

On August 9, 2019, the band released the EP Our Bones. The EP features two new full-length songs, an ambient interlude, and a cover of "1979", originally by The Smashing Pumpkins.

Musical style and influences
The Contortionist's musical style has been described as progressive metal and progressive rock. The band's early work showed one-time experiments in other metal genres outside their primary sound; their second EP Apparition has been described as deathcore. Robby Baca has stated that his influences include Planet X, Pat Metheny, Meshuggah, Allan Holdsworth, Between the Buried and Me, Dream Theater, The Dear Hunter, Textures, Deftones, Gojira, and Animosity. Former member Jonathan Carpenter also stated that his personal influences include Dream Theater and ambient composer Brian Eno. Other influences include Rush, Isis, and Cynic.

Members

Current
 Robby Baca guitars (2007–present); bass (2014); keyboards (2007–2014)
 Joey Baca drums (2007–present)
 Cameron Maynard guitars (2007–present)
 Michael Lessard vocals (2013–present) (of Last Chance to Reason)
 Eric Guenther keyboards (2014–present)
 Jordan Eberhardt bass (2014–present) (formerly of Scale the Summit)

Former
 Jake Morris vocals (2007–2008)
 Dave Hoffman vocals, keyboards (2008–2010) (Ishia, ex-Boreworm, ex-Into the Silence, ex-Wounded Knee)
 Jonathan Carpenter vocals, keyboards (2010–2013) (Foreign Waves)
 Christopher Tilley bass (2007–2014)

Timeline

Discography

Studio albums

EPs

Singles

Music videos

Concert tours
This Is Where It Ends Tour – All Shall Perish, Carnifex, Fleshgod Apocalypse, Conducting from the Grave, The Contortionist
To Catch a Predatour – The Acacia Strain, The Red Chord, Terror, GAZA, The Contortionist
The Summer Slaughter Survivors Tour – Conducting from the Grave, The Contortionist, Scale the Summit, Volumes, Structures, Rings of Saturn
Intrinsic Tour – The Contortionist, Jeff Loomis, Chimp Spanner, 7 Horns 7 Eyes
2012 Co-Headliner – Born of Osiris, Unearth, The Contortionist, Obey the Brave, Wolves at the Gate
Frak the Gods Tour – Periphery, The Human Abstract, Textures, The Contortionist
MetalSucks Tour – The Contortionist, Revocation, Fallujah, Toothgrinder
The Coma Ecliptic Tour – Between the Buried and Me, Animals as Leaders, The Contortionist
The Good Fight North American Tour – The Contortionist, Within the Ruins, I Declare War, Reflections, City in the Sea
European Tour – Protest the Hero, The Faceless, The Contortionist, Destrage
The Divinity of Purpose Tour – Hatebreed, Shadows Fall, Dying Fetus, The Contortionist
Future Sequence Tour – Between the Buried and Me, The Faceless, The Contortionist, The Safety Fire
Escape From the Studio Tour – Periphery, The Contortionist, Intervals, Toothgrinder
Traced in Constellations Tour – Sleepmakeswaves, The Contortionist, Tangled Thoughts of Leaving
Fall 2014 Tour – The Contortionist, Intervals, Polyphia
2015 North America Tour – The Contortionist, Chon, Auras
Polaris North America Tour – Tesseract, The Contortionist, ERRA, Skyharbor
Polaris United Kingdom Tour – Tesseract, The Contortionist, Nordic Giants
2016 North America Tour – The Contortionist, Monuments, Entheos, Sleepmakeswaves
The Mothership Tour – Dance Gavin Dance, The Contortionist, Hail the Sun, Good Tiger, The White Noise
European Unrest Tour – Periphery, The Contortionist, Destrage
The Sonic Unrest Part II Tour – Periphery, The Contortionist, Norma Jean, Infinity Shred
Colors 10th Anniversary Tour – Between the Buried and Me, The Contortionist, Polyphia, Toothgrinder
The Stories We Tell Ourselves Tour – Nothing More, The Contortionist, Big Story, Kirra
The Clairvoyant Tour – The Contortionist, Silent Planet, Skyharbor, Strawberry Girls, Sikth, AlithiA
The Reimagined Tour – The Contortionist, Intervals
Animals as Leaders 10 Year Anniversary Tour – Animals as Leaders, The Contortionist
Performing Language and Exoplanet in Their Entireties - The Contortionist, Rivers of Nihil

See also

 List of E1 Music artists
 Music of Indiana

References

External links
 
 

American deathcore musical groups
American progressive metal musical groups
American technical death metal musical groups
Djent
Heavy metal musical groups from Indiana
Musical groups established in 2007
Musical groups from Indianapolis